{{DISPLAYTITLE:C14H28O2}}
The molecular formula C14H28O2 (molar mass: 228.37 g/mol) may refer to:

 Dodecyl acetate, the dodecyl ester of acetic acid
 Myristic acid, a common saturated fatty acid

Molecular formulas